The Peace Research Institute Oslo (PRIO) Director's Shortlist is a list of candidates considered worthy to win the Nobel Peace Prize for their efforts and actions for the promotion of peace. Since 2002, PRIO's Director traditionally presents a shortlist of the most worthy potential Nobel laureates based on independent assessments and researches, and among the shortlisted candidates, some have been eventually recognized as such.

List of shortlisted candidates

References

External links
Nobel Peace Prize – Peace Research Institute Oslo nobelprize.orgs

Nobel laureates